William Methuen Phillips Powell (21 January 1901 – 1981) was an English professional footballer who played as a wing half.

References

1901 births
1981 deaths
Sportspeople from Sutton-in-Ashfield
Footballers from Nottinghamshire
English footballers
Association football wing halves
Retford Town F.C. players
Ashfield United F.C. players
Sheffield Wednesday F.C. players
Grimsby Town F.C. players
Southend United F.C. players
English Football League players